Aeronautical Development Establishment, often abbreviated as ADE, is an Indian football club based in Bangalore, Karnataka, that competes in the Bangalore Super Division, which is a fourth tier league in Indian football league system. It is sponsored by Aeronautical Development Establishment and is an "institutional side".

ADE first played professional football in 1982 when it competed in the Bangalore 'C' Division, then the third tier of Bangalore's football league system. They first played in the Super Division in 2000 and won the league for the first time in the 2013–14 season. After a brief hiatus, the team returned for the 2018–19 season.

Squad

Honours
 Bangalore Super Division
Champions (1): 2013–14
Third place (1): 2011–12

References 

Football clubs in Bangalore
Works association football clubs in India
1982 establishments in Karnataka
Association football clubs established in 1982